WT20 can refer to:

 Women's T20 cricket, such as WT20I's. 
 Twenty20 Cricket World Cup, formerly known as World Twenty20